Allison Therese Abbate (born July 23, 1965) is an American film producer and animator, primarily of animated films.

Biography 

Abbate gained experience in animation while working on The Little Mermaid for The Walt Disney Company, before working on The Rescuers Down Under and The Nightmare Before Christmas where she first met Tim Burton.

She first worked with Warner Bros. as a co-producer on the film Space Jam in 1996. She then helped produce The Iron Giant for which she won a BAFTA award. In 2006 she was nominated for a "Motion Picture Producer of the Year" award by the Producers Guild of America for her work on Tim Burton's Corpse Bride.

Abbate shifted to the United Kingdom in 2004 to set up an animation production facility for 3 Mills Studios. In 2009, she worked on Fantastic Mr. Fox. She was also the voice of Rabbit's ex-girlfriend in the film. Abbate later worked on Burton's Frankenweenie, making it her third major project with Burton (alongside Corpse Bride and The Nightmare Before Christmas).

Abbate is married to Tony Cervone, an animation director, writer and producer, since 2012. She returned to the United States in 2012 to serve as an executive producer on Warner Animation Group's first feature, The Lego Movie, released in 2014.

In 2017 she was appointed as the Executive Vice President of Warner Animation Group and oversaw films like Lego Ninjago, Scoob!, Smallfoot, Teen Titans Go! To the Movies, Lego Movie 2, Tom and Jerry, Space Jam: A New Legacy and DC League of Super-Pets. She decided to step down in August 2022 after the merger of WarnerMedia and Discovery, Inc.

Filmography 
 Out of This World (1988) (production associate)
 The Rescuers Down Under (1990) (assistant production manager: layout/retakes)
 The Nightmare Before Christmas (1993) (artistic coordinator)
 Runaway Brain (1995) (associate producer)
 Space Jam (1996) (animation co-producer)
 The Iron Giant (1999) (producer)
 Looney Tunes: Back in Action (2003) (animation producer)
 Corpse Bride (2005) (producer)
 Fantastic Mr. Fox (2009) (producer)
 Frankenweenie (2012) (producer)
 The Lego Movie (2014) (executive producer)
 Smallfoot (2018) (executive producer)
 Scoob! (2020) (producer)
 Tom & Jerry (2021) (executive producer)
 Space Jam: A New Legacy (2021) (executive producer)
 DC League of Super-Pets (2022) (executive producer)

References

External links 

BAFTA winners (people)
American animated film producers
American expatriates in England
Living people
1965 births
American women film producers
American film producers
People from Brooklyn
21st-century American women
Warner Bros. people
Warner Bros. Animation people